The Redlands Bowl is an amphitheatre in Redlands, California, USA, founded in 1924. It is used for music and theatrical performances which are offered to the public at no charge. The existing structure was commissioned and built by Florence and Clarence White as a gift to the City of Redlands in 1931. A portion of Proverbs 29:18, "Without vision a people perish", is inscribed across the frieze above the stage.

The Redlands Shakespeare Festival has occurred the last three weekends in May every year since its inception in 2004, presenting three full-scale Shakespearean productions in repertory, along with a series of educational lectures, community workshops, and special events. The 2014 festival was canceled.

The Redlands Bowl Summer Music Festival takes place each summer from late June through August, with 18-20 programs in diverse musical genres offered on Tuesday and Friday nights. It is the oldest continuous music festival in the United States at which no admission is charged.

The Redlands Bowl also serves as a venue for other productions and community events.

References

External links
Official web site
Official web site of Redlands Shakespeare Festival

Buildings and structures in Redlands, California
Amphitheaters in California
Outdoor theatres
Music venues in California
Shakespeare festivals in the United States
1924 establishments in California
Tourist attractions in San Bernardino County, California
History of Redlands, California